Josipa Mamić (born 7 January 1996) is a Croatian handballer for RK Lokomotiva Zagreb and the Croatian national team.

She represented Croatia at the 2020 European Women's Handball Championship.

References

External links

1996 births
Living people
Croatian female handball players
Handball players from Zagreb
21st-century Croatian women